Montreal Subdivision refers to the following rail lines:
Montreal Subdivision (CN), Montreal to Dorval
Montreal Subdivision (CSX Transportation), a railroad line in the U.S. state of New York and Canadian province of Quebec, originally from Massena, New York, northeast to Kahnawake, Quebec, along a former New York Central Railroad line